Daniel Baker (born May 18, 1981), known professionally as Desus Nice, is an American  television, YouTube, and Twitter personality. He rose to prominence with Complex TV's Desus vs. Mero, which was a 46-episode podcast that was first released on December 18, 2013. He was the co-host of Viceland's Desus & Mero talk show alongside The Kid Mero until June 2018, and  co-hosted Desus & Mero which premiered on February 21, 2019 on Showtime.

Early life
Baker was born on May 18, 1981 in The Bronx, New York City to Jamaican immigrant parents. He was raised in the Wakefield section of The Bronx with his three siblings. Growing up, his mother was the senior librarian at the New York Public Library's Soundview Library branch. His father is a landlord. 

Baker attended the nearby Pablo Casals Middle School in Co-op City, where he met Chris Hayes in the gifted program, before going on to attend Herbert H. Lehman High School. He earned a degree in Literature from the College of Mount Saint Vincent. 

Baker enjoyed working with computers from a young age. His ability to fix his family's computer during his childhood earned him the nickname "Jesus," which he changed to Desus to reflect his first name.

He worked several jobs before joining Black Enterprise as a small business columnist, where he remained until 2014 before leaving to pursue a career in television.

Career
In December 2014, MTV announced that Desus Nice and The Kid Mero would be joining the cast of Guy Code for season 5, along with eleven other new cast members. They appeared on the first episode of season 5 which aired on January 14, 2015. After building a relationship with MTV and MTV2, Desus and Mero appeared on other shows including Uncommon Sense and Joking Off.

On September 12, 2015, Desus along with co-host The Kid Mero released the first episode of their Bodega Boys podcast. They recorded their comedic takes on all things pop culture weekly at Red Bull Studios New York for several years before making the move to the "jam room" in Milk Studios. 

On August 30, 2016, Viceland announced Desus & Mero which premiered on October 17, 2016. The half-hour show ran Monday through Thursday hosted by the Bronx-reared comedic duo. Its finale aired on June 28, 2018. Desus co-hosted Desus & Mero, which premiered on February 21, 2019 on Showtime and ran until June 2022.

Personal life 
As of 2020, Baker lives in the Mott Haven section of the South Bronx.

Filmography

References

American male comedians
Living people
American people of Jamaican descent
People from the Bronx
Comedians from New York (state)
College of Mount Saint Vincent alumni
1981 births
Late night television talk show hosts